Machias may refer to:

Places
 Machias, Maine, a New England town
 Machias (CDP), Maine, the main village within the town
 Machias Bay, in Washington County, Maine 
 Machias River (Aroostook River tributary) in northern Maine
 Machias River in eastern Maine
 Machias Seal Island, an island in the Gulf of Maine
 Machias, New York, a town
 Machias (CDP), New York, the main hamlet within the town
 Machias, Washington, a census-designated place

Ships
 USS Machias, the name of more than one United States Navy ship